Lee Eun-hee (born 15 August 1975) is a South Korean figure skater. She competed in the ladies' singles event at the 1992 Winter Olympics.

References

1975 births
Living people
South Korean female single skaters
Olympic figure skaters of South Korea
Figure skaters at the 1992 Winter Olympics
Place of birth missing (living people)